The Caribou River is a river in the Unorganized Part of Thunder Bay District in Northwestern Ontario, Canada. The river is part of the James Bay drainage basin. It runs from Outlet Bay on Caribou Lake to Caribou Bay on Smoothrock Lake. Smoothrock Lake flows via several outlets including the Ogoki River directly, and then via the Ogoki River and the Albany River to James Bay.

Tributaries
Caribou Lake
Campbell Creek

References

Sources

Rivers of Thunder Bay District